Patricia Wartusch and Petra Mandula were the defending champions, but Mandula chose not to compete in 2003. Wartusch played with Rita Grande, but lost in the first round.

Gisela Dulko and María Emilia Salerni won the title.

Seeds

  Rita Grande /  Patricia Wartusch (first round)
  Henrieta Nagyová /  Elena Tatarkova (final)
  Jelena Kostanić /  Trudi Musgrave (first round)
  Marta Marrero /  Rossana de los Ríos (quarterfinals)

Results

Draw

References

2003 WTA Tour
Morocco Open
2003 in Moroccan tennis